Elizabeth Tinnon (born May 21, 1985) is an American breaststroke swimmer.  She is a bronze medalist from the Pan American Games.

Personal

Tinnon was born in Bowling Green, Kentucky in 1985, the daughter of Mack and Susan Tinnon.  Tinnon is a 2003 graduate of Bowling Green High School.  Tinnon attended the University of Texas and graduated in 2007, majoring in corporate communication.

Swimming career

As a nineteen-year-old, Tinnon competed at the 2004 U.S. Olympic Team Trials, finishing twelfth in the 100-meter breaststroke and fourteenth in the 200-meter breaststroke.

At the 2007 Pan American Games in Rio de Janeiro, she won a bronze medal in the 100-meter breaststroke.  At the 2008 U.S. Olympic Team Trials, Tinnon finished eight in the 100-meter breaststroke and sixteenth in the 200-meter breaststroke. At the 2009 National Championships, Tinnon placed fifth in the 200-meter breaststroke and eleventh in the 100-meter breaststroke.

References

External links
 
 
 Elizabeth Tinnon – University of Alabama assistant coach bio

1985 births
Living people
American female breaststroke swimmers
Texas Longhorns women's swimmers
American female swimmers
Swimmers at the 2007 Pan American Games
Pan American Games bronze medalists for the United States
Pan American Games medalists in swimming
Medalists at the 2007 Pan American Games